

Events

January

 January 2 – The International Covenant on Economic, Social and Cultural Rights enters into force.
 January 5 – The Pol Pot regime proclaims a new constitution for Democratic Kampuchea.  
 January 18 – Full diplomatic relations are established between Bangladesh and Pakistan 5 years after the Bangladesh Liberation War.  
 January 27 
 The United States vetoes a United Nations resolution that calls for an independent Palestinian state.  
 The First Battle of Amgala breaks out between Morocco and Algeria in the Spanish Sahara.

February

 February 4
 The 1976 Winter Olympics begin in Innsbruck, Austria.
 The 7.5  Guatemala earthquake affects Guatemala and Honduras with a maximum Mercalli intensity of IX (Violent), leaving 23,000 dead and 76,000 injured.
 February 9 – The Australian Defence Force is formed by unification of the Australian Army, the Royal Australian Navy and the Royal Australian Air Force.
 February 13 
 General Murtala Mohammed of Nigeria is assassinated in a military coup.
 February 19 – Former Tower of Power vocalist Rick Stevens is arrested in the United States for murdering three men during a botched drug deal. He ultimately serves 36 years of a life sentence.
 February 24 – Cuba's constitution of 1976 is enacted.
 February 26 – The Spanish Armed Forces withdraw from Western Sahara.
 February 27 – The Polisario Front, Western Sahara's national liberation movement,  declares independence of the territory under the name "Sahrawi Arab Democratic Republic". On February 28, Madagascar becomes the first country to recognise it.

March

 March – The Cray-1, the first commercially developed supercomputer, is released by Seymour Cray's Cray Research, with the first purchaser being the Energy Research and Development Administration (ERDA) in Los Alamos, New Mexico.
 March 1 
 U.K. Home Secretary Merlyn Rees ends Special Category Status for those sentenced for scheduled terrorist crimes relating to the civil violence in Northern Ireland.
 Bradford Bishop allegedly murders five of his family members in Bethesda, Maryland. The crime goes undiscovered for 10 days and the suspect is never caught. From 2014 to 2018 he is on the FBI Ten Most Wanted Fugitives list.
 March 4
 The Northern Ireland Constitutional Convention is formally dissolved in Northern Ireland, resulting in Direct rule over Northern Ireland by the Government of the United Kingdom in London.
 The Maguire Seven are found guilty in London of possessing explosives for use by the Provisional Irish Republican Army and subsequently jailed for 14 years; their convictions will be overturned in 1991.
 March 9 – A cable car disaster in Cavalese, Italy leaves 43 dead.
 March 9–11 – Two coal mine explosions claim 26 lives at the Blue Diamond Coal Co. Scotia Mine, in Letcher County, Kentucky.
 March 14 – After eight years on NBC, The Wizard of Oz returns to CBS, where it will remain until 1999, setting what is likely a record at that time for the most telecasts of a Hollywood film on a commercial television network. (That record is broken by The Ten Commandments in 1996, which began its annual network telecasts on ABC in 1973, continuing be telecast by that network as of 2020.)
 March 16 – Harold Wilson resigns as Prime Minister of the United Kingdom.
 March 17 – American boxer Rubin Carter is retried in New Jersey for murder; his conviction is upheld on this occasion but will be overturned in 1985.
 March 20 – Patty Hearst is found guilty of armed robbery of a San Francisco bank in 1974.
 March 22 – Star Wars begins filming in Tunisia.
 March 23 – In a feud between Japanese ultranationalists, Mitsuyasu Maeno attempts to assassinate Yoshio Kodama by flying a plane into his Tokyo house.
 March 24
 Argentina military forces depose president Isabel Perón.
 A general strike takes place in the People's Republic of the Congo.
 March 26  
 The Toronto Blue Jays are created as a baseball team.
 The Body Shop, the retail chain for skin care products and cosmetics founded by Anita Roddick, opens its first branch in Brighton, England.
 March 27
 The South African Defence Force withdraws from Angola and concludes Operation Savannah.
 The first  of the Washington Metro subway system opens.
 March 29 – The military dictatorship of General Jorge Videla comes to power in Argentina.
 March 30 – Land Day: Arab citizens of Israel protest against intended appropriation of land by the government.
 March 31 – The New Jersey Supreme Court rules that patient in a persistent vegetative state in the Karen Ann Quinlan case can be disconnected from her ventilator. She remains comatose and dies in 1985.
 March late – The first truly complete recording of the opera Porgy and Bess is released in a 3-LP set, by Decca Records in England and by London Records in the U.S. It stars Willard White and Leona Mitchell. The orchestra is the Cleveland Orchestra conducted by Lorin Maazel.

April

 April 1
 Apple Computer Company is formed by Steve Jobs and Steve Wozniak in California.
 Conrail (Consolidated Rails Corporation) is formed by the U.S. government, to take control of 13 major Northeast Class-1 railroads that have filed for bankruptcy protection. Conrail takes control at midnight, as a government-owned and operated railroad until 1986, when it is sold to the public.
 The Jovian–Plutonian gravitational effect is first reported by British astronomer Patrick Moore.
 April 2 – Norodom Sihanouk is forced to resign as Head of State of Kampuchea by the Khmer Rouge led by Pol Pot and is placed under house arrest.
 April 3 – The Eurovision Song Contest 1976 is won by Brotherhood of Man, representing the United Kingdom, with their song Save Your Kisses for Me.
 April 5
 James Callaghan becomes Prime Minister of the United Kingdom.
 Tiananmen Incident: Large crowds lay wreaths at Beijing's Monument of the Martyrs to commemorate the death of Premier Zhou Enlai. Poems against the Gang of Four are also displayed, provoking a police crackdown.
 Segovia prison break: in Spain's largest prison break since the Spanish civil war, 29 political prisoners escape from Segovia prison.
 April 10 – Frampton Comes Alive!, the multi-platinum selling live album by English rock musician Peter Frampton hits #1 in the Billboard 200 and remains there for 10 weeks, becoming the best-selling album of the year.
 April 11 – Steve Jobs and Steve Wozniak launch the first Apple computer, the Apple I, for the U.S. hobbyist market.   
 April 13
 The Lapua Cartridge Factory explosion in Lapua, Finland kills 40.
 The United States Treasury Department reintroduces the two-dollar bill as a Federal Reserve Note on Thomas Jefferson's 233rd birthday as part of the United States Bicentennial celebration.
 April 16 – As a measure to curb population growth, the minimum age for marriage in India is raised to 21 years for men and 18 years for women.
 April 21 – The Great Bookie Robbery in Melbourne: Bandits steal A$1.4 million in bookmakers' settlements from Queen Street, Melbourne.
 April 23 
 Punk rock group the Ramones release their first album, Ramones.
 Jethro Tull release their album, Too Old to Rock 'n' Roll: Too Young to Die!
 April 25 – Portugal's new constitution is enacted.
 April 29 – Sino-Soviet split: A concealed bomb explodes at the gates of the Soviet embassy in China, killing four Chinese. The targets were embassy employees, returning from lunch, but on this day they had returned to the embassy earlier.

May

 May 1 – Neville Wran becomes Premier of New South Wales.
 May 4
 The first LAGEOS (Laser Geodynamics Satellite) is launched.
 A train crash in Schiedam, the Netherlands, kills 24 people.
 May 6 – An earthquake hits the Friuli area in Italy, killing more than 900 people and making another 100,000 homeless.
 May 9 – Ulrike Meinhof of the Red Army Faction is found hanged in an apparent suicide in her Stuttgart-Stammheim prison cell.
 May 11
U.S. President Gerald Ford signs the Federal Election Campaign Act.
 An accident involving a tanker truck carrying anhydrous ammonia takes place in Houston, Texas, resulting in the deaths of 7 people.
 May 13 – Video arcade game Breakout is released.
 May 16 – The Montreal Canadiens sweep the Philadelphia Flyers in four games to win the Stanley Cup in ice hockey. Flyers' forward Reggie Leach became the only non-goaltender from a finals losing team to win the Conn Smythe Trophy as MVP of the playoffs after scoring a record 19 goals in 16 playoff games.
 May 21
 The Yuba City bus disaster, the second-worst bus crash in U.S. history, leaves 28 students and one teacher killed.
 The "Famous Fire" in McKeesport, Pennsylvania, destroys seven downtown structures, damages more than 12 others, and starts fires in at least 10 homes.
 May 24
 Washington, D.C. Concorde service begins.
 The Judgment of Paris pits French vs. California wines in a blind taste-test in Paris, France.  California wines win the contest, surprising the wine world and opening the wine industry to newcomers in several countries.
 May 25 – U.S. President Gerald Ford defeats challenger Ronald Reagan in 3 Republican presidential primaries: Kentucky, Tennessee and Oregon.
 May 31 – Syria intervenes in the Lebanese Civil War in opposition to the Palestine Liberation Organization, which it has previously supported.

June

 June 1 – The United Kingdom and Iceland end the Third Cod War, with the UK accepting Iceland's extension of its territorial waters to 200 nautical miles in exchange for defined fishing rights.
 June 2 
 A car bomb fatally injures Arizona Republic reporter Don Bolles.
 The Philippine government opens relations with the Soviet Union.
 June 4 – The Boston Celtics defeat the Phoenix Suns 128–126 in triple overtime in Game 5 of the National Basketball Association Finals at the Boston Garden. In 1997, the game is selected by a panel of experts as the greatest of the NBA's first 50 years.
 June 5 – The Teton Dam collapses in southeast Idaho in the US, killing 11 people.
 June 6 – The Double Six Crash, a plane crash in Kota Kinabalu, Malaysia, kills everyone on board, including Sabahan Chief Minister Tun Fuad Stephens.
 June 12 – Alberto Demicheli, a jurist, is inaugurated as a civilian de facto President of Uruguay after Juan María Bordaberry is deposed by the military.
 June 13 – Savage thunderstorms roll through the state of Iowa, spawning several tornadoes, including an F-5 tornado that destroys the town of Jordan.
 June 14 – The trial begins at Oxford Crown Court in England of Donald Neilson, the multiple killer known as the Black Panther. He will be convicted and serve the remainder of his life in prison.
 June 16
 The Soweto uprising in South Africa begins.
 Francis E. Meloy Jr., newly appointed U.S. Ambassador to Lebanon, and two others are kidnapped in Beirut and killed.
 June 17 – The National Basketball Association and the American Basketball Association agree on the ABA–NBA merger.
 June 20
 Hundreds of Western tourists are moved from Beirut and taken to safety in Syria by the U.S. military, following the murder of the U.S. Ambassador.
 General elections are held in Italy, resulting in the best result for the Communist Party (PCI) in a general election.
 Czechoslovakia beats West Germany 5–3 on penalties to win Euro 76 when the game ends 2–2 after extra time.
 June 25 – Strikes start in Poland (Ursus, Radom, Płock) after communists raise food prices; they end on June 30.
 June 26 – The CN Tower is opened in Toronto, the tallest free-standing land structure opens to the public.
 June 27
 G-6 is renamed "Group of 7" (G-7) with the inclusion of Canada.
 Palestinian militants hijack an Air France plane in Greece with 246 passengers and 12 crew. They take it to Entebbe, Uganda.
 June 28
 Inauguration of the north lane of the Rodovia dos Imigrantes.
 June 29
 Seychelles gains independence from the United Kingdom.
 The Conference of Communist and Workers Parties of Europe convenes in East Berlin.

July

 July 2 – North Vietnam dissolves the Provisional Government of South Vietnam and unites the two countries to form the Socialist Republic of Vietnam.
 July 3
 Gregg v. Georgia: The Supreme Court of the United States rules that the death penalty is not inherently cruel or unusual and is a constitutionally acceptable form of punishment overturning the Furman v. Georgia case of 1972.
 The great heat wave in the United Kingdom, which is currently suffering from drought conditions, reaches its peak.
 July 4
 The U.S. celebrates its bicentennial, in recognition of the 200th anniversary of the 1776 adoption of the United States Declaration of Independence from the United Kingdom.
 Entebbe Raid: Israeli airborne commandos free 103 hostages being held by Palestinian hijackers of an Air France plane at Uganda's Entebbe Airport; Yonatan Netanyahu and several Ugandan soldiers are killed in the raid.
 July 6 – The first class of women is inducted at the United States Naval Academy in Annapolis, Maryland.
 July 7
 German left-wing women terrorists Monika Berberich, Gabriella Rollnick, Juliane Plambeck and Inge Viett escape from the Lehrter Straße maximum security prison in West Berlin.
 David Steel becomes leader of the UK's Liberal Party in the aftermath of the scandal which forced out Jeremy Thorpe.
 July 10
 Four mercenaries, three British and one American, are shot by firing squad in Angola, following the Luanda Trial.
 Seveso disaster: An explosion in Seveso, Italy, causes extended pollution to a large area in the neighborhood of Milan, with many evacuations and a large number of people affected by the toxic cloud.
 July 12 – In the United States:
 California State University, Fullerton massacre: seven people are shot and killed, and two others are wounded in a mass shooting on campus at California State University, Fullerton.
 Barbara Jordan is the first African-American to keynote a political convention.
 Price Club, as predecessor of Costco, a worldwide membership-registration-only retailer, is founded in California.
 Family Feud debuts on ABC-TV.
 July 15
 Jimmy Carter is nominated for U.S. president at the Democratic National Convention in New York City.
 Twenty-six Chowchilla schoolchildren and their bus driver are abducted and buried in a box truck within a quarry in Livermore, California. The captives dig themselves free after 16 hours. The quarry-owner's son and two accomplices are arrested for the crime.
 July 16–20 – Albert Spaggiari and his gang break into the vault of the Société Generale Bank in Nice, France.
 July 17
 The 1976 Summer Olympics begin in Montreal, Quebec, Canada.
 East Timor is declared the 27th province of Indonesia.
 July 18 – 14-year-old Romanian gymnast Nadia Comăneci earns the first of seven perfect scores of 10 at the 1976 Summer Olympics.
 July 19 – Sagarmatha National Park in Nepal is created.
 July 20 
 Viking program: The Viking 1 lander successfully lands on Mars.
 American criminal Gary Gilmore is arrested for murdering two men in Utah.
 July 21 – A Provisional Irish Republican Army bomb kills Christopher Ewart-Biggs, new British ambassador to the Irish Republic, and Judith Cooke, a Northern Ireland Office private secretary, in Dublin; two others are seriously wounded but survive. 
 July 26 – In Los Angeles, Ronald Reagan announces his choice of liberal U.S. Senator Richard Schweiker as his vice presidential running mate, in an effort to woo moderate Republican delegates away from President Gerald Ford.
 July 27
 The United Kingdom breaks diplomatic relations with its former colony Uganda in response to the hijacking of Air France Flight 139.
 Delegates attending an American Legion convention at The Bellevue-Stratford Hotel in Philadelphia, US, begin falling ill with a form of pneumonia: this will eventually be recognised as the first outbreak of Legionnaires' disease and will end in the deaths of 29 attendees.
 July 28 – The Tangshan earthquake flattens Tangshan, China, killing 242,769 people, and injuring 164,851.
 July 29 – In New York City, the "Son of Sam" pulls a gun from a paper bag, killing one and seriously wounding another, in the first of a series of attacks that terrorize the city for the next year.
 July 30
 Caitlyn Jenner wins the gold medal in the men's decathlon at the 1976 Summer Olympics in Montreal.
 In Santiago, Chile, Cruzeiro from Brazil beats River Plate from Argentina and are the Copa Libertadores de América champions in Association football.
 July 31
 NASA releases the famous Face on Mars photo, taken by Viking 1.
 The Big Thompson River in northern Colorado floods, destroying more than 400 cars and houses and killing 143 people.

August

 August 1
 The 1976 Summer Olympics ends in Montreal, Quebec, Canada.
 Trinidad and Tobago becomes a republic, replacing Elizabeth II as its head of state with President Ellis Clarke.
 The Seattle Seahawks play their first American football game.
 Defending F1 World Champion Niki Lauda suffers serious burns in the German Grand Prix after a huge accident that nearly cost him his life.
 August 2 – A gunman murders Andrea Wilborn and Stan Farr and injures Priscilla Davis and Gus Gavrel, in an incident at Priscilla's mansion in Fort Worth, Texas. T. Cullen Davis, Priscilla's husband and one of the richest men in Texas, is tried and found innocent for Andrea's murder, involvement in a plot to kill several people (including Priscilla and a judge), and a wrongful death lawsuit. Cullen goes broke afterwards.
 August 5 – The clock of "Big Ben" at the Palace of Westminster in London suffers internal damage and requires frequent repairs.  The clock is stopped at times on 26 of the next 275 days.
 August 6 – Former United Kingdom Postmaster General John Stonehouse is sentenced to 7 years' jail for fraud, theft and forgery.
 August 7 – Viking program: Viking 2 enters into orbit around Mars.
 August 8 – As part of the American Basketball Association–National Basketball Association merger, a dispersal draft is conducted to assign teams for the players on the two ABA franchises which have folded.
 August 10—13 – Hurricane Belle hits Long Island and southern New England. Twelve people are killed by the storm and damage is $100 million.
 August 11 – A sniper rampage in Wichita, Kansas on a Holiday Inn results in 3 deaths while 7 others are wounded.
 August 14
 Around 10,000 Protestant and Catholic women demonstrate for peace in Northern Ireland.
 The Senegalese political party PAI-Rénovation is legally recognized, becoming the third legal party in the country.
 August 16 – The Ramones make their first "professional" performance at CBGB in New York City.
 August 18 – At Panmunjom, North Korea, two United States soldiers are killed while trying to chop down part of a tree in the Korean Demilitarized Zone which has obscured their view.
 August 19 – U.S. President Gerald Ford edges out challenger Ronald Reagan to win the Republican Party presidential nomination in Kansas City.
 August 21 – Disappearance of Andy Puglisi: Massachusetts child Angelo "Andy" Puglisi goes missing from a public pool near his home; the case is never solved.
 August 24 – In Uruguay, the army captures Marcelo Gelman and his pregnant wife. Gelman is later killed and his wife disappears. 
 August 25 
 Jacques Chirac resigns as Prime Minister of France; he is succeeded by Raymond Barre.
 Landslide disaster in Sau Mau Ping, Hong Kong.
 August 26
 The first known outbreak of Ebola virus occurs in Yambuku, Zaire.
 Prince Bernhard of Lippe-Biesterfeld, husband of Queen Juliana of the Netherlands, resigns from various posts over a scandal involving alleged corruption in connection with business dealings with the Lockheed Corporation.
 August 28 – Actress Anissa Jones, famous for playing Buffy Davis in the television series Family Affair, is found dead of an accidental overdose in Oceanside, California.
 August 30 – James Alexander George Smith McCartney is sworn in as the first chief minister of the Turks and Caicos Islands.

September

 September 1
 Cigarette and tobacco advertising is banned on Australian television and radio.
 Aparicio Méndez, a jurist, is inaugurated as a civilian de facto President of Uruguay in the framework of a dictatorship.
 The state of emergency in the Republic of Ireland legally still in force since 1939 is lifted.
 September 3 – Viking program: The Viking 2 spacecraft lands at Utopia Planitia on Mars, taking the first close-up color photographs of the planet's surface.
 September 4 – 1500th anniversary of the Fall of the Western Roman Empire.
 September 6
 Cold War: Soviet Air Force pilot Lt. Viktor Belenko lands a MiG-25 jet fighter at Hakodate, on the island of Hokkaidō in Japan, and requests political asylum in the United States.
 Frank Sinatra brings Jerry Lewis's former partner Dean Martin onstage, unannounced, at the 1976 Jerry Lewis MDA Telethon in Las Vegas, reuniting the comedy team for the first (and only) time in over 20 years.
 September 10
 Zagreb mid-air collision: A British Airways Trident and a Yugoslav DC-9 collide near Zagreb, Yugoslavia (modern-day Zagreb, Croatia), killing all 176 aboard.
 September 13 – The Muppet Show is broadcast in the United Kingdom for the first time, on ITV. 
 September 15 – Darryl Sittler scores the winning goal in the 1976 Canada Cup for Canada to win over Czechoslovakia in overtime, to win the first Canada Cup in ice hockey. 
 September 16
 Shavarsh Karapetyan saves 20 people from a trolleybus that had fallen into a Yerevan reservoir.
 Beginning with the Night of the Pencils, a series of kidnappings and forced disappearances followed by torture, rape, and murder of students under the Argentine dictatorship takes place.
 September 17 – The space shuttle Enterprise is rolled out of a Palmdale, California hangar.
 September 20–21 – The semi-legendary 100 Club Punk Special festival in London ignites the careers of several influential punk and post-punk bands, arguably sparking the punk movement's introduction into mainstream culture.
 September 21
 The Seychelles join the United Nations.
 Orlando Letelier is assassinated in Washington, D.C. by agents of Chilean dictator Augusto Pinochet.
 September 24 – Patty Hearst is sentenced to seven years in prison for her role in the armed robbery of a San Francisco bank in 1974 (an executive clemency order from U.S. President Jimmy Carter will set her free after only 22 months).
 September 25 – Irish rock band U2 is formed after drummer Larry Mullen, Jr. posts a note seeking members for a band on the notice board of his Dublin school.
 September 28 – American singer Stevie Wonder releases his hit album Songs in the Key of Life.

October

 October 4 – The InterCity 125 high-speed train is introduced in the United Kingdom.
 October 6
 Cubana de Aviación Flight 455 crashes due to a bomb placed by anti-Fidel Castro terrorists, after taking off from Bridgetown, Barbados; all 73 people on board are killed.
 Students gathering at Thammasat University in Bangkok, Thailand are massacred, while protesting the return of ex-dictator Thanom Kittikachorn by a coalition of right-wing paramilitary and government forces, triggering the return of the military to government.
 In San Francisco, during his second televised debate with Jimmy Carter, U.S. President Gerald Ford stumbles when he declares that "there is no Soviet domination of Eastern Europe" (there is at the time).
 The Cultural Revolution in China concludes upon the capture of the Gang of Four.
 October 8 – Thorbjörn Fälldin replaces Olof Palme as Prime Minister of Sweden.
 October 9 – Pittsburgh Pirates baseball pitcher Bob Moose is killed in a car crash in Ohio on his 29th birthday.
 October 10 – Taiwan Governor Hsieh Tung-min is injured by a letter bomb from a pro-independence activist.
 October 12 – The People's Republic of China announces that Hua Guofeng is the successor to Mao Zedong as Chairman of the Chinese Communist Party following the latter's death on September 9 from a heart attack.
 October 13 – The United States Commission on Civil Rights releases the report, Puerto Ricans in the Continental United States: An Uncertain Future, that documents that Puerto Ricans in the United States have a poverty rate of 33 percent in 1974 (up from 29 percent in 1970), the highest of all major racial-ethnic groups in the country (not including Puerto Rico, a U.S. territory).
 October 18 – Ford officially launches volume production of the Fiesta car at its Valencia plant in Spain.
 October 19
 The Battle of Aishiya is fought in Lebanon.
 The Copyright Act of 1976 extends copyright duration for an additional 19 years in the United States.
 The Chimpanzee (Pan troglodytes) is placed on the list of endangered species.
 October 20 – The Mississippi River ferry MV George Prince is struck by a ship while crossing from Destrehan, Louisiana to Luling, Louisiana, killing 78 passengers and crew.
 October 22 
 Cearbhall Ó Dálaigh, the 5th President of Ireland, resigns after being publicly insulted by the Minister for Defense.
 The Damned release their debut single "New Rose", making them the first British punk band to release a single, beating the Sex Pistols by a month. 
 October 24 – James Hunt wins a very political Formula One World Championship by just 1 point driving a McLaren M23-D as rival Niki Lauda retires from the Japanese Grand Prix due to heavy rain.
 October 25 – Clarence Norris, the last known survivor of the Scottsboro Boys, is pardoned.
 October 26 – Transkei gains "independence" from South Africa.
 October 28 – British evolutionary biologist Richard Dawkins' book The Selfish Gene is published, introducing the term memetics.

November

 November – Diffie–Hellman key exchange cryptography is proposed.
 November 2 – 1976 United States presidential election: Jimmy Carter narrowly defeats incumbent Gerald Ford, becoming the first candidate from the Deep South to win since the Civil War.
 November 4 – Mark Fidrych, pitcher for the Detroit Tigers, wins 1976 Major League Baseball Rookie Of The Year Award.
 November 12 – Disappearance of Renee MacRae and her 3-year-old son Andrew from Inverness in Scotland; this becomes Britain's longest-running missing persons case.
 November 15 – The first megamouth shark is discovered off Oahu in Hawaii.
 November 19 – Jaime Ornelas Camacho takes office as the first President of the Regional Government of Madeira, Portugal.
 November 24 – 1976 Çaldıran–Muradiye earthquake: Between 4,000 and 5,000 are killed in a 7.3  earthquake at Van and Muradiye in eastern Turkey.
 November 25 – In San Francisco, The Band holds its farewell concert, The Last Waltz.
 November 26
 Microsoft is officially registered with the Office of the Secretary of the State of New Mexico.
 The Warsaw Treaty Organization joint secretariat is established.
 November 29 – The New York Yankees sign free agent Reggie Jackson to a five-year $3 million contract, setting the precedent for lucrative multi-year contracts for Major League Baseball players in years to come.

December

 December 1
 Angola joins the United Nations.
 José López Portillo takes office as President of Mexico.
 The Sex Pistols achieve public notoriety, as they unleash several four-letter words live on Bill Grundy's early evening television show in the United Kingdom.
 Sir Douglas Nicholls is appointed the 28th Governor of South Australia, the first Australian Aboriginal appointed to vice-regal office.
 December 3 
 Attempted assassination of Bob Marley (and his manager Don Taylor) in a shooting at his home in Kingston, Jamaica.
 Patrick Hillery is sworn in after being elected unopposed as the 6th President of Ireland.
 December 4 – The Central African Republic officially becomes a monarchy as the Central African Empire, and President Jean-Bedel Bokassa proclaims himself Emperor Bokassa I.
 December 5 – The Japanese general election takes place, and the ruling Liberal Democratic Party loses its majority in the 511-member House of Representatives, but remains the largest party with 249 seats. 
 December 6 – The Viet Cong is disbanded, and its former members become a part of the Vietnam People's Army.
 December 8 – The Congressional Hispanic Caucus is established by the five Latinos in the United States Congress: Herman Badillo of the Bronx, E. de la Garza and Henry B. Gonzalez of Texas, Edward R. Roybal of California, and the nonvoting Resident Commissioner of Puerto Rico, Baltasar Corrada del Río.
 December 10 – The United Nations General Assembly adopts the Convention on the Prohibition of Military or Any Other Hostile Use of Environmental Modification Techniques.
 December 15
 Samoa joins the United Nations.
 Denis Healey announces to the British Parliament that he has successfully negotiated a £2.3bn loan from the International Monetary Fund.
 December 23 – A new volcano, Murara, erupts in eastern Zaire.

Date unknown
 Plans to move the Nigerian capital from Lagos to Abuja are approved.
 Random breath testing is introduced in Victoria (Australia).
 California's sodomy law is repealed.
 Thomas A. Minetree founds Bethesda Cancer Centers in the United States.
 The first laser printer is introduced by IBM (the IBM 3800).
 The New Jersey Legislature passes legislation legalizing casinos in the shore town of Atlantic City commencing in 1978. After signing the bill into law, Governor Brendan Byrne declares "The mob is not welcome in New Jersey!" referring to the Mafia's influence at casinos in Nevada.
 The Early Academic Outreach Program (EAOP) is established by the University of California (UC) in response to the State Legislature's recommendation to expand post-secondary opportunities to all of California's students including those who are first-generation, socioeconomically disadvantaged, and English-language learners.
 Universe, a public domain film produced by Lester Novros for NASA, is released.
 Marc Brown's children's picture book Arthur's Nose is published in the United States.

Births

January

 January 2 – Paz Vega, Spanish actress 
 January 3 – Angelos Basinas, Greek footballer  
 January 4 – August Diehl, German actor 
 January 6 – Johnny Yong Bosch, American actor and musician  
 January 13
 Michael Peña, American actor  
 Mario Yepes, Colombian football player 
 January 16 – Martina Moravcová, Slovak swimmer
 January 21 – Emma Bunton, English musician
 January 23
 Anne Margrethe Hausken, Norwegian orienteer 
 Angelica Lee, Taiwanese actress and singer 
 January 27
 Ahn Jung-hwan, South Korean footballer and television personality  
 January 28 – Rick Ross, American rapper

February

 February 1 
 Katrín Jakobsdóttir, Icelandic politician, 28th Prime Minister of Iceland 
 Muteba Kidiaba, Congolese football goalkeeper
 February 2
 Carlos Coste, Venezuelan free-diver
 James Hickman, British swimmer
 Lori Beth Denberg, American actress and comedian
 February 3
 Isla Fisher, Australian actress 
 Tim Heidecker, American comedian
 Tijana, Macedonian singer
Daddy Yankee, Puerto Rican singer songwriter and rapper 
 February 4 – Cam'ron, African-American rapper
 February 5
 Abhishek Bachchan, Indian actor
 Tony Jaa, Thai martial art film actor/choreographer/director
 Brian Moorman, American football player
 February 6
 James Hiroyuki Liao, American actor
 Kim Zmeskal, American gymnast
 February 9 – Charlie Day, American actor
 February 10 – Lance Berkman, American baseball player
February 10 – Keeley Hawes, British actress 
 February 11 – Brice Beckham, American actor
 February 12
 Jenni Falconer, British television presenter
 Silvia Saint, Czech actress
 February 14 – Erica Leerhsen, American actress
 February 15 – Brandon Boyd, American singer-songwriter and author
 February 16
 Kyo, Japanese rock musician (Dir En Grey)
 Adam Simpson, Australian rules footballer
 Janet Varney, American actress and comedian
 February 17 – Svein Berge, Norwegian musician (Röyksopp)
 February 18 – Chanda Rubin, American tennis player
 February 20
 Johanna Beisteiner, Austrian guitarist
 Chris Cillizza, American journalist
 February 21 – Michael McIntyre, British stand-up comedian
 February 23 
 Aaron Aziz, Singaporean-born Malaysian actor
 Jeff O'Neill, Canadian hockey player
 Kelly Macdonald, Scottish actress
 February 24
 Yuval Noah Harari, Israeli historian
 Zach Johnson, American golfer
 February 25 – Rashida Jones, American actress, writer, model and musician
 February 27 
 Tony Gonzalez, American football player
 Sergei Semak, Russian football player and coach
 Yukari Tamura, Japanese voice actress and songwriter
 February 28
 Ali Larter, American actress and model
 Guillaume Lemay-Thivierge, Canadian actor
 February 29
 Ja Rule, American rapper
 Shane Johnson, American actor
 Katalin Kovács, Hungarian sprint kayaker
 Mark Pollock, blind Irish adventurer and author

March

 March 1
 Luke Mably, British actor
 Peter Bell, Australian rules footballer
 March 3
Fraser Gehrig, Australian rules footballer
Isabel Granada, Filipino actress and singer (d. 2017)
 March 5
 Šarūnas Jasikevičius, Lithuanian basketball player
 Lucian Msamati, English actor
Neil Jackson, English actor 
 March 6 – Ken Anderson, American professional wrestler (Mr. Anderson)
 March 8
 Sergej Ćetković, Montenegrin singer
 Gaz Coombes, English musician and singer-songwriter (Supergrass)
 Freddie Prinze Jr., American actor
 March 9 – Yamila Diaz-Rahi, Argentinean model
 March 10 – Miroslav Kostadinov, Bulgarian singer and songwriter
 March 11 
 Thomas Gravesen, Danish footballer
 Craig Parkinson, British actor 
 March 12 – Zhao Wei, Chinese singer and actress
 March 13 – Danny Masterson, American actor
 March 14 
 Merlin Santana, American actor (d. 2002)
 Corey Stoll, American actor
 Sarah Ulmer, New Zealand cyclist
 March 15
 Abhay Deol, Indian actor
 Cara Pifko, Canadian actress
 March 16
 Nick Spano, American actor
 Blu Cantrell, American R&B singer
 Pál Dárdai, Hungarian football player and manager
 Kim Johnsson, Swedish hockey player
 Zhu Chen, Chinese chess grandmaster
 March 17
 Stephen Gately, Irish singer (Boyzone) (d. 2009)
 Álvaro Recoba, Uruguayan footballer
 March 18
 Emma Willis, English television presenter and former model
 FanFan, American-born Taiwanese singer-songwriter
 March 19
 Rachel Blanchard, Canadian actress
 Andre Miller, American basketball player
 Alessandro Nesta, Italian football player
 March 20 – Chester Bennington, American singer (Linkin Park) (d. 2017)
 March 21 – Rachael MacFarlane, American actress and singer, sister of Seth MacFarlane
 March 22
 Teun de Nooijer, Dutch field hockey player
 Shawty Lo, American rapper (d. 2016)
 Kellie Shanygne Williams, American actress
 Reese Witherspoon, American actress
 March 23
 Sir Chris Hoy, Scottish cyclist
 Keri Russell, American actress
 Sa Beining, Chinese host
 March 24
 Aaron Brooks, American football player
 Aliou Cissé, Senegalese footballer
 Peyton Manning, American football player
 March 25 
 Somy Ali, Pakistani actress
 Wladimir Klitschko, Ukrainian professional boxer
 Gigi Leung, Hong Kong singer and actress
 March 26
 Amy Smart, American actress
 Eirik Verås Larsen, Norwegian sprint kayaker
 Nurgül Yeşilçay, Turkish actress
 March 27 – Liu Limin, Chinese swimmer
 March 29 – Jennifer Capriati, American tennis player
 March 30
 Jessica Cauffiel, American actress and singer
 Ty Conklin, American ice-hockey player
 Ayako Kawasumi, Japanese voice actress
 March 31 – Vice Ganda, Filipino comedian

April

 April 1
 Troy Baker, American actor and musician
 Hazem El Masri, Lebanese-Australian rugby league player
 David Oyelowo, English-American actor
Clarence Seedorf, Dutch footballer
 April 2
 Lucy Diakovska, German-Bulgarian pop singer
 Daisuke Namikawa, Japanese voice actor
 Rory Sabbatini, South African golfer
 April 3 – Will Mellor, English actor
 April 4 
 Emerson, Brazilian footballer
 James Roday, American actor, director and screenwriter
 Paula Yacoubian, Lebanese politician and journalist
 April 5
 Fernando Morientes, Spanish footballer
 Natascha Ragosina, Russian boxer
 Henrik Stenson, Swedish golfer
 Sterling K. Brown, African-American actor
 April 6 – Candace Cameron Bure, American actress
 April 7 – Eric Wareheim, American comedian
 April 9 – 
 Kris Radlinski, English rugby league player
 Blayne Weaver, American actor and filmmaker
 Ramkarpal Singh, Malaysian politician
 April 10 – Jan Werner Danielsen, Norwegian singer (d. 2006)
 April 11 – Mimi Morales, Colombian actress
 April 12 – Andrei Lipanov, Russian ice skater
 April 13
 Glenn Howerton, American actor
 Jonathan Brandis, American actor, director and screenwriter (d. 2003)
 April 14 – Anna DeForge, American basketball player
 April 15
 Jason Bonsignore, Canadian ice-hockey player
 Brock Huard, American football player
 Steve Williams, British rower
 April 16
 David Lyons, Australian actor
 Lukas Haas, American actor and musician
 Robert Dahlqvist, Swedish guitarist and vocalist (d. 2017)
 Shu Qi, Taiwanese actress
 April 17 – Monet Mazur, American actress
 April 18
 Gavin Creel, American actor and singer-songwriter
 Melissa Joan Hart, American actress
 Sean Maguire, British actor and singer
 April 19
Wyatt Cenac, American actor, writer and director
Kim Young-oh, South Korean illustrator 
 April 20
 Joey Lawrence, American actor
 Shay Given, Irish football goalkeeper
 April 21
 Rommel Adducul, Filipino basketball player
 Petero Civoniceva, Australian rugby league player
 April 22 – Michał Żewłakow, Polish footballer
 April 23 – Darren Huckerby, English footballer
 April 24
 George P. Bush, American attorney and politician
 Steve Finnan, Irish footballer
 April 25
 Tim Duncan, American basketball player
 Denis Kartsev, Russian professional ice hockey player
 Rainer Schüttler, German tennis player
 Kim Jong-kook, South Korean singer, television personality
 Amir Fryszer Guttman, Israeli singer
 April 26 – Elisabet Reinsalu, Estonian actress
 April 27 – Sally Hawkins, English actress
 April 28 
 Michael Carbonaro, American actor, magician and improv artist
 Joseph N'Do, Cameroonian former international footballer 
 April 29
 Jay Orpin, Swedish composer and record producer
 Shiho Kawaragi, Japanese voice actress 
April 30 – Ankaralı Namık, Turkish singer

May 

 May 1
 Darius McCrary, American actor
 James Murray, American actor
 Michele Frangilli, Italian archer
 May 3 
 Beto, Portuguese footballer
 Jeff Halpern, American ice hockey player
 May 4 
 Jason Michaels, American baseball player
 Anza, Japanese actress and singer best known for playing the character of Sailor Moon in some Sailor Moon musical 
 May 5 
 Juan Pablo Sorín, Argentine footballer and sports broadcaster
 Sage Stallone, American actor, film director, producer and distributor (d. 2012)
 May 6 – Marshall Burt, American railroader and politician
 May 7
 Stacey Jones, New Zealand rugby league player 
 Michael P. Murphy, U.S. Navy SEAL, First recipient of the Medal of Honor in the Afghanistan War (d. 2005)
 May 8
 Martha Wainwright, Canadian-American folk-pop singer
 Makoto Yukimura, Japanese manga artist
 May 10
 Rhona Bennett, American actress, singer and model
 Rogério Oliveira da Costa, Brazilian-born football striker (d. 2006)
 May 11 – Kardinal Offishall, Canadian rapper
 May 14 – Martine McCutcheon, British actress and singer
 May 15 
Tyler Walker, American baseball player
 Mark Kennedy, Irish footballer
 Jacek Krzynówek, Polish footballer
 Ryan Leaf, American football quarterback
Anže Logar, Slovenian politician, minister of foreign affairs 
 May 16 – Ana Paula Valadão, Brazilian worship leader, singer-songwriter, pastor, author and television presenter
 May 17 – Mayte Martínez, Spanish athlete
 May 19 – Kevin Garnett, African-American basketball player
 May 20 – Ramón Hernández, Venezuelan baseball player
 May 21 – Dara Bubamara, Serbian singer
 May 23 – Ricardinho, Brazilian football player and coach
 May 25
 Stefan Holm, Swedish high jumper
 Cillian Murphy, Irish actor
 Erinn Hayes, American actress
 Nadine Heredia, Peruvian politician, First Lady of Peru
 Ethan Suplee, American actor
 May 26 – Paul Collingwood, English cricketer
 May 28
 Alexei Nemov, Russian gymnast
 Liam O'Brien, American actor
 May 31
 Tony Hopper, English footballer (d. 2018)
 Colin Farrell, Irish actor
 Roar Ljøkelsøy, Norwegian ski jumper

June 

 June 2
 Antônio Rodrigo Nogueira, Brazilian mixed martial artist
 Tim Rice-Oxley, English rock musician/composer (Keane)
 Queen 'Masenate Mohato Seeiso of Lesotho
 June 3 – Jamie McMurray, American race car driver
 June 4 
 Alexei Navalny, Russian lawyer and political activist
 Nenad Zimonjić, Serbian tennis player
 June 5
 Aesop Rock, American hip-hop artist
 Marc Worden, Canadian actor and voice actor
 Joe Gatto, American comedian
 June 6
 Emilie-Claire Barlow, Canadian actress and singer
 Geoff Rowley, English skateboarder
 June 7
 Necro, American rapper
 Nora Salinas, Mexican actress and model
 Mirsad Türkcan, Serbian born-Turkish basketball player
 June 8 – Lindsay Davenport, American tennis player
 June 10
 Michel Brown, Argentine actor
 Esther Ouwehand, Dutch politician, parliamentarian for the Party for the Animals
 Mariana Seoane, Mexican actress
 June 12 – Thomas Sørensen, Danish football goalkeeper
 June 13
 Kym Marsh, British singer (Hear'Say) and actress
 Jason "J" Brown, British singer (5ive)
 June 14 
 Alan Carr, English comedian
 Lavínia Vlasak, Brazilian actress and model 
 June 16 – Tom Lenk, American actor
 June 17 
 Peter Svidler, Russian chess grandmaster
 Scott Adkins, English actor 
 June 18
 Petri Haapimaa, Finnish footballer and coach
 Brady Haran, Australian-British founder and cast of Numberphile channel
 Blake Shelton, American singer
 June 19 – Ryan Hurst, American actor
 June 20 – Juliano Belletti, Brazilian footballer
 June 21 – Antonio Cochran, American football player
 June 22 
 Mikko Luoma, Finnish ice-hockey player
 Mike O'Brien, American actor, writer and comedian
 June 23
 Brandon Stokley, American football player
 Paola Suárez, Argentine tennis player
 Emmanuelle Vaugier, Canadian actress
 Patrick Vieira, French footballer
 Gavin Williamson, British politician, Secretary of State for Education
 June 25 
 Maurren Maggi, Brazilian athlete and politician
 Sylvain N'Diaye, Senegalese footballer
 Neil Walker, American swimmer
 June 26 
 Cédric Jimenez, French film producer, film director and screenwriter
 Wilson Lima, Brazilian politician and journalist
 Alexander Zakharchenko, Ukrainian separatist rebel (d. 2018)
 June 27 – Joseph Sikora, American actor
 June 28
 Nawaf Al-Temyat, Saudi Arabian football (soccer) player 
 Jason J. Lewis, American voice actor
 David Palmer, Australian squash player
 Seth Wescott, American snowboarder
 June 29
 Annette Beutler, Swiss professional racing cyclist
 Katsutoshi Domori, Japanese football player
 Takahiro Mazuka, Japanese sprinter
 Omar Doom, American actor, musician and artist
 Ma Yili, Chinese actress
 Angelo Lekkas, Australian rules footballer
 June 30
 Tamara Sedmak, Swiss television presenter, model and actress
 Kazumasa Shimizu, Japanese football player
 Jason Bostic, American football defensive back 
 Christine Schürrer, German serial killer
 Gilbert Yvel, Dutch mixed martial artist

July 

 July 1
 Justin Lo, Hong Kong singer and actor
 Patrick Kluivert, Dutch footballer
 Haaz Sleiman, Lebanese-American actor
 Ruud van Nistelrooy, Dutch footballer
 Kellie Bright, English actress
 July 2
 Kon Arimura, Malaysian-Japanese radio personality, film critic and film commentator
 Krisztián Lisztes, Hungarian footballer
 Tommy Pistol, American actor and director 
 July 3
 Shane Lynch, Irish singer 
 Wanderlei Silva, Brazilian mixed martial artist
 Bobby Skinstad, Zimbabwean rugby union player
 Andrea Barber, American actress
 Henry Olonga, Zambian-Zimbabwean cricketer
 July 4 
 Rohan Nichol, Australian actor
 Aryan Vaid, Indian male model
 Jo Chen, American-Taiwanese comic book artist and writer
 Daijiro Kato, Japanese motorcycle racer (d. 2003)
 July 5
 Jamie Elman, Canadian-American actor
 Nuno Gomes, Portuguese footballer
 Rufus Johnson, American rapper also known as Bizarre
 July 7 
 Lina Teoh, Malaysian actress, television host and model
 Bérénice Bejo, Argentine actress
 Hamish Linklater, American actor and playwright
 Natasha Collins, English actress and model (d. 2008)
 July 8 
 Ellen MacArthur, English yachtswoman
 Grettell Valdez, Mexican television and film actress and fashion model
 July 9
 Fred Savage, American actor and director
 Arturo Carmona, Mexican actor
 Elliot Cowan, English actor
 July 10
 Edmílson, Brazilian footballer
 Ludovic Giuly, French footballer
 Adrian Grenier, American actor, musician and director
 Elissa Slotkin, American politician
 July 11 – Eduardo Nájera, Mexican basketball player
 July 12
 Anna Friel, English actress 
 Tracie Spencer, American R&B singer
 Kyrsten Sinema, American politician
 July 14 – Geraint Jones, Papua New Guinea cricketer
 July 15 
 Diane Kruger, German actress
 Jim Jones, American rapper, member of hip hop group The Diplomats
 Gabriel Iglesias, American actor, voice actor and comedian
 July 16
 Anna Smashnova, Israeli tennis player
 Bobby Lashley, American professional wrestler
 July 17
 Luke Bryan, American country music singer-songwriter
 Marcos Senna, Brazilian born-Spanish footballer
 Dagmara Domińczyk, Polish-American actress and author
 Eric Winter, American actor and fashion model
 July 18 – Elsa Pataky, Spanish actress and model
 July 19 
 Diether Ocampo, Filipino actor, singer and model
 Benedict Cumberbatch, English actor
 Eric Prydz, Swedish DJ and producer
 Vinessa Shaw, American actress
 July 20 – Alex Yoong, Malaysian racing driver
 July 21
 Cori Bush, American politician
 Tatyana Lebedeva, Russian long jumper
 Jaime Murray, English actress
 July 23 – Judit Polgár, Hungarian chess player
 July 24 
 Tiago Monteiro, Portuguese Formula One driver
 Yulia Navalnaya, Russian public figure, economist and activist
 Rashida Tlaib, American politician and lawyer
 July 25 – Timur Mutsurayev, Chechen bard
 July 26 
 Pável Pardo, Mexican footballer
 Martha Roby, American politician
 July 27 – Fernando Ricksen, Dutch professional footballer (d. 2019)
 July 28 – Jacoby Shaddix, American singer
 July 31 – Paulo Wanchope, Costa Rican footballer

August 

 August 1 
 Iván Duque, Colombian politician, 33rd President of Colombia
 Don Hertzfeldt, American animator
 Nwankwo Kanu, Nigerian footballer
 Hasan Şaş, Turkish football player and coach
 Amar Upadhyay, Indian television actor and model
 August 2 
 Kati Wilhelm, German biathlete
 Sam Worthington, English-born Australian actor
 August 4 
 Paul Goldstein, American tennis player
 David Lewis, Canadian actor
 August 5 – Napoleon Beazley, juvenile offender (d. 2002)
 August 6
 Andero Ermel, Estonian actor
 Soleil Moon Frye, American actress, director and screenwriter
 Melissa George, Australian actress
 Travis Kalanick, American businessman and computer programmer; co-founder of Uber
 August 7 – Nargiz Birk-Petersen, Azerbaijani-American lawyer, presenter and model
 August 8
 JC Chasez, American singer ('N Sync)
 Drew Lachey, American singer (98 Degrees)
 August 9
 Jessica Capshaw, American actress
 Aled Haydn Jones, Welsh radio producer and presenter
 Mark Priestley, Australian actor (d. 2008)
 Audrey Tautou, French actress
 August 11 
 Iván Córdoba, Colombian football player and manager
 Will Friedle, American actor, voice actor, writer and comedian
 August 12
 Mikko Lindström, Finnish rock guitarist
 Lina Rafn, Danish singer
 August 14 – Maya Nasri, Lebanese actress and singer
 August 15
 Abiy Ahmed, Ethiopian Prime Minister, recipient of the Nobel Peace Prize
 Boudewijn Zenden, Dutch football player
 August 16 – Kadri Rämmeld, Estonian actress
 August 18
 Lee Seung-yeop, South Korean baseball player
 Bryan Volpenhein, American rower
 August 21 – Liezel Huber, South African born-American tennis player
 August 23 – Scott Caan, American actor
 August 24 
 Alex O'Loughlin, Australian actor
 Yang Yang, Chinese short track skater
 August 25 – Alexander Skarsgård, Swedish actor
 August 26 – Mike Colter, American actor 
August 27
 Sarah Chalke, Canadian actress
 Carlos Moyá, Spanish tennis player
 Mark Webber, Australian racing driver
 August 29 
 Luana Piovani, Brazilian actress and model
 Jon Dahl Tomasson, Danish footballer
 August 30 – Cristian Gonzáles, Uruguayan-born Indonesian footballer
 August 31 – Roque Júnior, Brazilian footballer

September 

 September 1
 Marcos Ambrose, Australian racing driver
 Ivano Brugnetti, Italian race walker
 Sebastián Rozental, Chilean footballer
 September 3
 Jevon Kearse, American football player
 Samuel Kuffour, Ghanaian footballer
 Vivek Oberoi, Indian actor
 September 4 – Brian Myrow, American baseball player
 September 5 – Carice van Houten, Dutch actress
 September 6
 Naomie Harris, British actress
 Mark Wilkerson, American musician
 Robin Atkin Downes, English actor and voice actor
 September 7 – Stevie Case, American video game celebrity
 September 8 – Sjeng Schalken, Dutch tennis player
 September 9
 Mick Blue, Austrian pornographic actor and director
 Emma de Caunes, French actress
 Lúcia Moniz, Portuguese singer and actress
 September 10 – Gustavo Kuerten, Brazilian tennis player
 September 11 – Marco Rose, German football player and coach
 September 12 – Maciej Żurawski, Polish footballer
 September 13 – Puma Swede, Swedish pornographic actress
 September 15 – Rob Wiethoff, American actor
 September 16 – Tina Barrett, English singer (S Club 7)
 September 17 – Nicole Reinhart, American track and road racing cyclist (d. 2000)
 September 18 – Ronaldo, Brazilian footballer
 September 19
 Raja Bell, American basketball player
Isha Koppikar, Indian actress
 Alison Sweeney, American actress
 Sergey Tsinkevich, Belarusian footballer and referee
 September 20
 Jon Bernthal, American actor
 Yui Horie, Japanese voice actress
 Enuka Okuma, Canadian actress
 September 23 – Rob James-Collier, British actor and model
 September 24 – Stephanie McMahon-Levesque, American professional wrestling promoter
 September 25
 Chauncey Billups, American basketball player
 Chiara Siracusa, Maltese singer, Eurovision Song Contest 2005 runner-up
 September 26
 Michael Ballack, German footballer
 Kersti Heinloo, Estonian actress 
 September 27 – Francesco Totti, Italian footballer
 September 28 – Fedor Emelianenko, Russian mixed martial arts fighter
 September 29 – Andriy Shevchenko, Ukrainian footballer

October 

 Abu Ibrahim al-Hashimi al-Qurashi, Iraqi-born leader of the Islamic state (d. 2022)
 October 1
 Danielle Bisutti, American actress and singer
 Diana Haddad, Lebanese singer
 October 2 – Anita Kulcsár, Hungarian handball player (d. 2005)
 October 3 – Seann William Scott, American actor and producer
 October 4
 Mauro Camoranesi, Argentine born-Italian footballer
 Alicia Silverstone, American actress
 Ueli Steck, Swiss mountaineer (d. 2017)
 October 5 
 Ramzan Kadyrov, Head of the Chechen Republic
 Mauro Colagreco, Italian Argentine chef
Matt Hamill, American mixed martial arts fighter 
 October 6
 Freddy García, Venezuelan baseball player
 Barbie Shu, Taiwanese actress and singer
 October 7
 Taylor Hicks, American singer
 Pekka Kuusisto, Finnish violinist
 Gilberto Silva, Brazilian football player
 Santiago Solari, Argentine football player and coach
 October 8 – Peter Stickles, American actor
 October 9
 Sam Riegel, American voice actor and director
 Nick Swardson, American actor, stand-up comedian and screenwriter
 October 10
 Bob Burnquist, Brazilian skateboarder
 Shane Doan, Canadian ice hockey player
 October 11 – Emily Deschanel, American actress
 October 12 – Kajsa Bergqvist, Swedish high jumper
 October 14 
 Chang Chen, Taiwanese actor
 Carolina Tejera, Venezuelan model and actress
 October 15 – Yoon Son-ha, South Korean actress
 October 17 – Fabri Fibra, Italian rapper
 October 18 – Galder, Norwegian musician
 October 19
 Joe Duplantier, French musician
 Dan Smith, Canadian ice-hockey player
 Michael Young, American baseball player
 Desmond Harrington, American actor
 Omar Gooding, American actor
 October 20
 Dan Fogler, American actor, comedian and writer
 Plamen Goranov, Bulgarian photographer, mountain climber and a Varna-based local protest leader (d. 2013)
 October 21
 Jeremy Miller, American actor
 Lavinia Miloșovici, Romanian artistic gymnast
 Andrew Scott, Irish actor
 October 23
 Cat Deeley, British television presenter
 Ryan Reynolds, Canadian actor
 October 25 
 Steve Jones, Northern Irish footballer
 Anton Sikharulidze, Russian figure skater
 October 26
 Miikka Kiprusoff, Finnish hockey player 
 Jeremy Wotherspoon, Canadian speed skater
 Thurop Van Orman, American animator and voice actor
Florence Kasumba, Ugandan-born German actress 
 October 29 – Stephen Craigan, Northern Irish footballer
 October 31 
 Guti, Spanish football player and coach
 Piper Perabo, American actress

November 

 November 1 
 Chad Lindberg, American actor
 Sam Presti, American basketball executive, general manager of the NBA's Oklahoma City Thunder since 2007
 November 2 – Thierry Omeyer, French handball goalkeeper
 November 5
 Oleh Shelayev, Ukrainian footballer
 Sean Brown, Canadian ice-hockey player
 Sebastian Arcelus, American actor
 November 6
 Pat Tillman, American football player, victim of friendly fire (d. 2004)
 Troy Hambrick, American football player
 Wiley Wiggins, American actor
 Sal Vulcano, American actor
 November 7 – Mark Philippoussis, Australian tennis player
 November 8 – Brett Lee, Australian cricketer
 November 9
 Josh Kaufman, American singer-songwriter, winner of The Voice season 6
 Federica De Bortoli, Italian voice actress
 November 11 – Mike Leon Grosch, German singer
 November 12 
 Tevin Campbell, American singer and actor 
 Mirosław Szymkowiak, Polish footballer
 November 14 – František Čermák, Czech tennis player
 November 15 – Virginie Ledoyen, French actress
 November 17 – Diane Neal, American actress
 November 18 – Shagrath, Norwegian black metal musician (Dimmu Borgir)
 November 19
 Jack Dorsey, American software architect, businessman, co-founder of Twitter
 Jun Shibata, Japanese singer and songwriter
 Benny Vansteelant, Belgian duathlete (d. 2007)
 November 20
 Dominique Dawes, African-American Olympic gymnast
 Ji Yun-nam, North Korean footballer
 Laura Harris, Canadian actress
 November 22
 Torsten Frings, German footballer
 Ville Valo, Finnish rock singer (HIM)
 November 24
 Chen Lu, Chinese figure skater
 Christian Laflamme, Canadian ice-hockey player
 November 25
 Donovan McNabb, American football player
 Hienadz Shutau, Belarusian demonstrator (d. 2020)
 November 26 – Maia Campbell, American actress and singer
 November 27 – Jaleel White, African-American actor
 November 28 – Ryan Kwanten, Australian actor and comedian
 November 29 
 Chadwick Boseman, American actor and playwright (d. 2020)
 Anna Faris, American actress
 Ehren McGhehey, American stunt performer and actor

December 

 December 1 
 Matthew Shepard, American murder victim (d. 1998)
 Laura Ling, American journalist imprisoned by North Korea in 2009
 December 3
 Cornelius Griffin, American football player
 Marcos Denner, Brazilian footballer
 December 4 – Amie Comeaux, American country music singer (d. 1997)
 December 5
 Amy Acker, American actress
 Evonne Hsu, Taiwanese singer
 December 6 – Alicia Machado, Venezuelan beauty queen, Miss Universe 1996
 December 7 
 Mark Duplass, American actor, screenwriter and director
 Basma Hassan, Egyptian actress
 Georges Laraque, Canadian ice-hockey player
 Derek Ramsay, Filipino actor and model
 December 8
 Zoe Konstantopoulou, Greek lawyer and politician
 Dominic Monaghan, English-German actor
 December 11 
 Caroline Ducey, French actress
 Tatyana Kotova, Russian long jumper
 December 13 
 Mark Paston, New Zealand footballer
 Radosław Sobolewski, Polish footballer
 Rama Yade, Senegalese born-French politician
 December 14 – Leland Chapman, American bail bondsman
 December 17
 Takeo Spikes, American football player
 Dan Hageman, American screenwriter and television producer
 December 18
 Koyuki, Japanese actress
 December 21 – Mirela Maniani, Greek javelin thrower 
 December 23
 Jamie Noble, American professional wrestler
 Amjad Sabri, Pakistani Qawwali singer (d. 2016)
 Christopher Pizzey, English actor and comedian
 December 24 – Ángel Matos, Cuban taekwondo athlete
 December 25
 Tuomas Holopainen, Finnish metal keyboardist (Nightwish)
 Armin van Buuren, Dutch music producer and DJ
 December 26 
 Nadia Litz, Canadian actress and producer
 Dmitri Tertyshny, Russian professional ice hockey (d. 1999)
 December 27 
 Fernando Pisani, Canadian ice-hockey player
 Aaron Stanford, American actor
 December 28 – Joe Manganiello, American actor
 December 28 - Deddy Corbuzier, Indonesian actor, YouTuber and magician.
 December 29 – Danny McBride, American actor, comedian and writer
 December 31 – Ceza, Turkish rapper
 December 31
 Ceza, Turkish rapper
 Vanessa Kerry, American physician and health care administrator
 Chris Terrio, American film director/screenwriter

Date unknown 
 Pedro X. Molina, Nicaraguan caricaturist
 Birgit C. Muller, Austrian fashion designer, producer and philanthropist

Deaths

January

 January 3 – John Ainsworth-Davis, Welsh surgeon and athlete (b. 1895)
 January 5
 John A. Costello, former Taoiseach of the Republic of Ireland (b. 1891)
 Mal Evans, English road manager to The Beatles (b. 1935)
 Károly Takács, Hungarian Olympic shooter (b. 1910)
 January 8 – Zhou Enlai, 1st Premier of the People's Republic of China (b. 1898)
 January 10 – Howlin' Wolf, American blues singer (b. 1910)
 January 12 – Agatha Christie, English detective fiction writer (b. 1890)
 January 13 – Margaret Leighton, English actress (b. 1922)
 January 14
 Abdul Razak Hussein, Malaysian politician, 2nd Prime Minister of Malaysia (b. 1922)
 Muhammad Sakizli, 2nd Prime Minister of Libya (b. 1892)
 January 15 – Gengo Hyakutake, Japanese admiral (b. 1882)
 January 19 – Hidetsugu Yagi, Japanese electrical engineer (b. 1886)
 January 22 – Hermann Jónasson, Icelandic politician, 7th Prime Minister of Iceland (b. 1896)
 January 23 – Paul Robeson, American actor, singer, writer and activist (b. 1898)
 January 24 – Emil Bodnăraș, Romanian communist politician and army officer and Soviet agent (b. 1904)
 January 26 – Gabriele Allegra, Italian Roman Catholic priest and blessed (b. 1907)
 January 29 – Jesse Fuller, American one-man band musician (b. 1896)
 January 31 – Ernesto Miranda, American criminal and namesake of the Miranda right (b. 1941)

February 

 February 1
 Werner Heisenberg, German physicist, Nobel Prize laureate (b. 1901)
 Hans Hofmann, German artist (b. 1880)
 George Whipple, American scientist, recipient of the Nobel Prize in Physiology or Medicine (b. 1878)
 February 4 – Roger Livesey, Welsh actor (b. 1906)
 February 6 – Ritwik Ghatak, Bengali filmmaker and script writer (b. 1925)
 February 9 – Percy Faith, Canadian bandleader, orchestrator, composer and conductor (b. 1908)
 February 11 
 Lee J. Cobb, American actor (b. 1911)
 Alexander Lippisch, German aeronautical engineer (b. 1894)
 Dorothy Maud Wrinch, Mathematician and biochemical theorist (b. 1894)
 February 12 – Sal Mineo, American actor (b. 1939) 
 February 13 
 Murtala Mohammed, Nigerian general (b. 1938)
 Lily Pons, French-American operatic soprano and actress (b. 1898)
 February 17 – Jean Servais, Belgian actor (b. 1910)
 February 20
 René Cassin, French judge, recipient of the Nobel Peace Prize (b. 1887)
 Kathryn Kuhlman, American evangelist and faith healer (b. 1907)
 February 22 – Florence Ballard, American singer (The Supremes) (b. 1943)
 February 23 – L. S. Lowry, British artist (b. 1887)
 February 26 – Frieda Inescort, Scottish-born actress (b. 1901)

March 

 March 4 – Walter H. Schottky, German physicist (b. 1886)
 March 5
 Charles Lederer, American screenwriter and film director (b. 1910)
 Otto Tief, Estonian politician and military commander (b. 1889)
 March 6 – Maxie Rosenbloom, American boxer and actor (b. 1907)
 March 8 – Alfons Rebane, Estonian military commander (b. 1908)
 March 10 – Haddon Sundblom, Swedish illustrator and American artist (b. 1899)
 March 14 – Busby Berkeley, American choreographer and director (b. 1895)
 March 17 – Luchino Visconti, Italian theatre and film director (b. 1906)
 March 19 – Paul Kossoff, British rock guitarist (Free) (b. 1950)
 March 21 – Vladimir Peter "Spider" Sabich, American alpine pro ski racing champion (1971, 1972), Olympic skier (1968 Winter Olympics) and homicide victim (b. 1945)
 March 24
 Bernard Montgomery, British field marshal (b. 1887)
 E. H. Shepard, English artist and book illustrator (b. 1879)
 March 25 – Josef Albers, German-American artist (b. 1888)
 March 28 – Richard Arlen, American actor (b. 1899)
 March 31 – Paul Strand, American photographer (b. 1890)

April 

 April 1 
 Max Ernst, German artist (b. 1891)
 Alfred Lennon, father of musician John Lennon (b. 1912)
 April 4 – Harry Nyquist, American information theory pioneer (b. 1889)
 April 5 – Howard Hughes, American aviation pioneer, film director and millionaire recluse (b. 1905)
 April 8 – Renato Petronio, Italian rower (b. 1891)
 April 9 – Phil Ochs, American singer-songwriter (b. 1940)
 April 12 – Miriam Cooper, American actress (b. 1891)
 April 13 – Sabri al-Asali, Syrian politician, 3-time Prime Minister of Syria (b. 1903)
 April 14 – Mariano Ospina Pérez, Colombian politician, 17th President of Colombia (b. 1891)
 April 18 – Henrik Dam, Danish biochemist, recipient of the Nobel Prize in Physiology or Medicine (b. 1895)
 April 25
 Carol Reed, English film director (b. 1906)
 Markus Reiner, Israeli scientist (b. 1886)
 April 26 – Andrei Grechko, Soviet general, Minister of Defence (b. 1903)

May 

 May 3 – Ernie Nevers, American football player (b. 1902)
 May 7 – Alison Uttley, English children's author (b. 1884)
 May 9
 Jens Bjørneboe, Norwegian author (b. 1920)
 Ulrike Meinhof, German terrorist (b. 1934)
 May 11 – Alvar Aalto, Finnish architect (b. 1898)
 May 12 – Keith Relf, British rock musician (The Yardbirds) (b. 1943)
 May 15 – Samuel Eliot Morison, American historian (d. 1887)
 May 20 – Royal E. Ingersoll, American admiral (b. 1883)
 May 24 – Hugo Wieslander, Swedish Olympic athlete (b. 1889)
 May 26 
 Martin Heidegger, German philosopher (b. 1889)
 Edgar Moon, Australian tennis player (b. 1904)
 May 27 – Ruth McDevitt, American actress (b. 1895)
 May 28 – Zainul Abedin, Bangladeshi painter (b. 1914)
 May 30 – Mitsuo Fuchida, Japanese aviator, naval officer and Christian evangelist (b. 1902)
 May 31 – Jacques Monod, French biologist, recipient of the Nobel Prize in Physiology or Medicine (b. 1910)

June 

 June 2
 Abdul Rahman Hassan Azzam, Egyptian diplomat and politician, 1st Secretary-General of the Arab League (b. 1893)
 Juan José Torres, Bolivian politician and military leader, 50th President of Bolivia (b. 1920)
 June 5 – Robert Wichard Pohl, German physicist (b. 1884)
 June 6
 J. Paul Getty, American industrialist, founder of Getty Oil (b. 1892)
 David Jacobs, Welsh Olympic athlete (b. 1888)
 Fuad Stephens, Malaysian politician (b. 1920)
 Victor Varconi, Hungarian actor (b. 1891)
 June 7 
 Bobby Hackett, American jazz musician (b. 1915)
 Shigetarō Shimada, admiral in the Imperial Japanese Navy during World War II (b. 1883)
 June 9 – Dame Sybil Thorndike, British actress (b. 1882)
 June 10 – Adolph Zukor, Hungarian-born film producer (b. 1873)
 June 11 – Toots Mondt, American WWF promoter (b. 1894)
 June 12 – Nguyễn Ngọc Thơ, 1st Prime Minister of South Vietnam and 1st Vice President of South Vietnam (b. 1908)
 June 16 – Hector Pieterson, South African activist (b. 1963)
 June 17 – Richard Casey, Australian statesman and diplomat (b. 1890)
 June 24 – Imogen Cunningham, American photographer (b. 1883)
 June 27 – C. Wade McClusky, United States Navy admiral (b. 1902)
 June 28 - Stanley Baker, Welsh actor and film producer (b. 1928)

July 

 July 1
 Anneliese Michel, German Roman Catholic woman who was believed to be possessed by demons (b. 1952)
 Zhang Wentian, General Secretary of the Chinese Communist Party (b. 1900)
 July 4 – Yonatan Netanyahu, Israeli commando leader (b. 1946)
 July 6 – Zhu De, Head of State of China, China Red Army Commander-in-Chief (b. 1886)
 July 7
 Norman Foster, American film director (b. 1903)
 Gustav Heinemann, 6th President of the Federal Republic of Germany (b. 1899) 
 July 11 – León de Greiff, Colombian poet (b. 1895)
 July 12 – James Wong Howe, American cinematographer (b. 1899)
 July 14 – Joachim Peiper, German military leader (b. 1915)
 July 15 – Paul Gallico, American novelist, short story and sports writer (b. 1897)
 July 16 – Wilhelmina von Bremen, American sprint runner (b. 1909)
 July 22 – Sir Mortimer Wheeler, British archaeologist (b. 1890)
 July 23 – Basil Hopko, Czechoslovak Roman Catholic bishop and saint (b. 1904) 
 July 24 – Afro Basaldella, Italian painter (b. 1912)
 July 28 
 Maggie Gripenberg, Finnish dancer and choreographer (b. 1881)
 Lucie Mannheim, German singer and actress (b. 1899)
 July 29 – Mickey Cohen, American gangster (b. 1913)
 July 30 – Rudolf Bultmann, German Lutheran theologian (b. 1884)

August 

 August 2 – Fritz Lang, Austrian-German-American filmmaker, screenwriter and occasional film producer (b. 1890)
 August 6
 Gregor Piatigorsky, Russian cellist (b. 1903)
 Maria Klenova, Russian marine geologist (b. 1898)
 August 9 – José Lezama Lima, Cuban writer and poet (b. 1910)
 August 10 – Karl Schmidt-Rottluff, German painter (b. 1884)
 August 12 – Tom Driberg, British politician/journalist (b. 1905)
 August 22 – Juscelino Kubitschek, 21st President of Brazil (b. 1902)
 August 25 – Eyvind Johnson, Swedish novelist, recipient of the Nobel Prize in Literature (b. 1900)
 August 26 – Lotte Lehmann, German soprano (b. 1888)
 August 28 – Anissa Jones, American actress and student (b. 1958)
 August 29 – Jimmy Reed, American blues musician (b. 1925)

September 

 September 5 – Arthur Gilligan, English cricketer (b. 1894)
 September 9 – Mao Zedong, Chinese revolutionary and political theorist, Chairman of the Chinese Communist Party (b. 1893)
 September 10 – Dalton Trumbo, American screenwriter and novelist (b. 1905)
 September 13 – Camilo Ponce Enríquez, Ecuadorian political figure, 30th President of Ecuador (b. 1912)
 September 14 – Prince Paul of Yugoslavia, (b. 1893)
 September 15 – Josef Sudek, Czech photographer (b. 1896)
 September 16 – Bertha Lutz, Brazilian zoologist, politician, diplomat and feminist (b. 1894)
 September 19 – Yehezkel Abramsky, Russian-born British rabbi (b. 1886)
 September 21 – Orlando Letelier, Chilean economist, politician and diplomat (assassinated) (b. 1932)
 September 26 – Leopold Ružička, Yugoslav chemist, Nobel Prize laureate (b. 1887)
 September 28 – Raymond Collishaw, Canadian World War I fighter ace (b. 1893)

October 

 October 5
 Lars Onsager, Norwegian-born American physical theoretical physicist, 1968 Nobel Prize laureate (b. 1903)
 Barbara Nichols, American actress (b. 1928)
 October 9 – Troy H. Middleton, American general and educator (b. 1889)
 October 10 – Silvana Armenulić, Yugoslav singer (b. 1939)
 October 14 
 Edith Evans, British actress (b. 1888)
 Suleiman Nabulsi, Prime Minister of Jordan (b. 1908) 
 October 15 – Carlo Gambino, Italian-American mobster (b. 1902)
 October 18 – Giacomo Lercaro, Italian Roman Catholic cardinal (b. 1891)
 October 31 – Eileen Gray, Irish furniture designer (b. 1878)

November 

 November 8 – Gottfried von Cramm, German tennis player (b. 1909)
 November 9 – Armas Taipale, Finnish Olympic athlete (b. 1890)
 November 11 – Alexander Calder, American sculptor (b. 1898)
 November 15 – Jean Gabin, French actor (b. 1904)
 November 18 – Man Ray, American artist (b. 1890)
 November 20 – Trofim Lysenko, Soviet biologist and agronomist of Ukrainian origin (b. 1898)
 November 23 – André Malraux, French novelist (b. 1901)
 November 28 – Rosalind Russell, American actress (b. 1907)
 November 29 – Godfrey Cambridge, American comedian and actor (b. 1933)
 November 30 – Ivan Yakubovsky, Marshal of the Soviet Union (b. 1912)

December 

 December 2 – Danny Murtaugh, Pittsburgh Pirates baseball player and manager (b. 1917)
 December 3
 Alfredo Dinale, Italian Olympic cyclist (b. 1900)
 Angelo Iachino, Italian admiral (b. 1889)
 Mary Nash, American actress (b. 1884)
 December 4 
 Tommy Bolin, American guitarist (b. 1951)
 Benjamin Britten, English composer (b. 1913)
 December 6 – João Goulart, Brazilian politician, 24th President of Brazil (b. 1918)
 December 12 – Jack Cassidy, American actor (b. 1927)
 December 15 – Grégoire Kayibanda, Rwandan politician, 2nd President of Rwanda (b. 1924)
 December 19 – Giuseppe Caselli, Italian painter (b. 1893)
 December 20
 Richard J. Daley, Mayor of Chicago since 1955 (b. 1902)
 Ned Washington, American lyricist (b. 1901)
 December 28 – Freddie King, American rock guitarist (b. 1934)

Nobel Prizes 

 Physics – Burton Richter, Samuel Chao Chung Ting
 Chemistry – William Nunn Lipscomb, Jr
 Physiology or Medicine – Baruch S. Blumberg, D Carleton Gajdusek
 Literature – Saul Bellow
 Peace – Betty Williams and Mairead Corrigan
 Economics – Milton Friedman

References 

 
Leap years in the Gregorian calendar